The Lovibond comparator is an example of a colorimeter made in Britain by The Tintometer Ltd.  It was invented in the 19th century by Joseph Williams Lovibond and updated versions are still available.

Description

The device is used to determine the color of liquids. A sample is put in a glass tube.  The tube is inserted in the comparator and compared with a series of coloured glass discs until the nearest possible match is found.

Among other things, the device is used to determine the concentration of certain chemicals in solution. In this use, some assumptions are made about what is in the sample. Given those assumptions, the concentration will be indicated by the disc which best matches the color of the solution.

There are a number of standard tests in which a sample to be tested is mixed a colour reagent. In such tests, the resulting color indicates the concentration of the sample under test.

Results can be approximate compared to other testing techniques, but the comparator is useful for field work because it is portable, rugged and easy to use.  If a more exact measurement is required other tests can be conducted in a laboratory.

It is used in chemistry lab where the pH of the sample can be measured(approximately) using lovibond comparator.

Optical instruments
Laboratory equipment